Ansung Polytechnic College, formerly known as Ansung Women's Polytechnic College until 2005, was South Korea's only women's polytechnic college. In 2015 It adopted coed policy and was used as Korea Polytechnics Anseong Campus. In 2020 it was rebranded as Korea Polytechnics' semiconductor campus.

It was located in Anseong City, Gyeonggi province.  It contained departments of nanotechnology, digital design, CAD and computer modelling, internet media, and jewelry technology. Unlike most technical colleges, it included a dormitory, which can house as many as 420 students. The school graduates about 600 students per year from its technical training programs.

See also
Education in South Korea
List of colleges and universities in South Korea

External links
Official school website, in Korean

Vocational education in South Korea
Universities and colleges in Gyeonggi Province
Educational institutions with year of establishment missing
Anseong
Korea Polytechnics
Educational institutions established in 1987
1987 establishments in South Korea
Defunct universities and colleges in South Korea